Bronson Alcott Pinchot (born May 20, 1959) is an American actor. He is best known for playing Balki Bartokomous on the ABC sitcom Perfect Strangers (1986–93). He also performed in films, such as Risky Business (1983), Beverly Hills Cop (1984), After Hours (1985), True Romance (1993), Beverly Hills Cop III (1994), Stephen King's The Langoliers (1995), It's My Party (1996), Courage Under Fire (1996) and The First Wives Club (1996), and in television series, such as Lois & Clark: The New Adventures of Superman, Meego and Chilling Adventures of Sabrina. In 2012, he starred in his own reality series, The Bronson Pinchot Project on the DIY Network.

Pinchot has worked extensively as an audiobook narrator, with over 100 recordings as of 2014. AudioFile magazine recognized him as Best Voice in Fiction & Classics for his 2010 renderings of Flannery O'Connor's Everything That Rises Must Converge (1965), Karl Marlantes's Matterhorn: A Novel of the Vietnam War (2009) and David Vann's Caribou Island (2011).

Early life 
Pinchot was born in New York City. His mother, Rosina, was a typist and house cleaner, while his father was a bookbinder, born in New York and raised in Paris. Pinchot's paternal grandparents were from Russia and settled in France following the Russian Revolution. Upon returning to the United States, Pinchot's father changed his surname from Poncharavsky to "Pinchot".

When Pinchot was two and a half, his family moved to South Pasadena, California. He graduated at the top of his class from South Pasadena High School and earned a full scholarship to Yale University. There, he resided at Morse College and intended to study fine arts, but instead majored in theater studies, graduating with honors.

After graduation, a casting director discovered him, which led to his film debut, Risky Business.

Career 

Pinchot appeared in several feature films, such as Hot Resort, Risky Business, Beverly Hills Cop, The First Wives Club, True Romance, Courage Under Fire and It's My Party. He also played Dennis Kemper in the short-lived NBC sitcom Sara. Pinchot was hired to replace Fisher Stevens as Ben Jabituya in the 1986 film Short Circuit, but Pinchot eventually left the production in order to begin work on Perfect Strangers, and Stevens was subsequently rehired for the role.

Starting in 1986, Pinchot played Balki Bartokomous on the long-running ABC sitcom Perfect Strangers. When the show concluded filming its eight-season run in September 1992 (with the condensed final season airing during the summer of 1993), Pinchot secured the starring role on a new sitcom for CBS, entitled The Trouble with Larry. The series premiered just three weeks after ABC's Perfect Strangers finale in August 1993, and one episode (which never aired) was directed by Mark Linn-Baker, Pinchot's co-star on Strangers. After three weeks of dismal ratings and poor reviews, The Trouble with Larry was canceled. Pinchot would subsequently be rehired by Perfect Strangers producers Tom Miller and Bob Boyett for roles on two more of their sitcoms: Step By Step, where he played French hairdresser Jean-Luc Rieupeyroux in early 1997, and, that fall, on Meego, where he played an alien who crash-landed on Earth and took up residence with an American family.

In 2008, Pinchot read the audio version of The Learners, author Chip Kidd's followup to The Cheese Monkeys. He also voiced Max, the fully restored Black 1964 VW Beetle, in the 2009 Volkswagen "Das Auto" campaign.

Between 2009 and 2014, Pinchot narrated over 100 audiobooks. In 2010, Pinchot read the audio version of the novels Matterhorn and Blood Oath. For the Blackstone Audio collection Patricia Highsmith: Selected Novels and Short Stories, he provided a reading of several stories, including Strangers on a Train. Pinchot also narrated for Christopher Healy's children's series, The Hero's Guide. He was recognized for his work with a number of awards, including Audible.com's 2010 Narrator of the Year.

On February 12, 2012, Pinchot starred in a home restoration show on DIY Network titled The Bronson Pinchot Project. The program is based on his hobby of restoring old homes using salvaged materials.

On March 8, 2018, it was announced that Pinchot would play George Hawthorne, the villainous, puritanical principal of Baxter High, who regularly clashes with Sabrina Spellman and her friends in the Netflix series The Chilling Adventures of Sabrina. The series premiered in October 2018.

Personal life 
In 1999, Pinchot spent a great deal of time in Harford, Pennsylvania, restoring the circa 1839 mansion built by Joab Tyler (father of historian William Seymour Tyler) and later inhabited by former Pennsylvania state Senator Edward E. Jones. Pinchot purchased six properties in the small rural town of 1,300 residents "in an effort to revive the town's 19th-century aesthetic."

In 2015 he filed for Chapter 13 bankruptcy, claiming liabilities between $100,000 and $500,000. All of his properties in Harford were subsequently put up for sale. Pinchot told the Wilkes-Barre Citizens' Voice, "I have two skills: I can make old houses beautiful and I can make people laugh. Other than that I'm a waste of space. Well, I'm a dedicated son and brother, but I have no head for businesses."

As of April 2017, he owned two tiny homes, one measuring 77 square feet, the other 153 square feet.

Filmography

Film

Television

Awards and nominations

References

External links 
 
 

1959 births
Living people
American male film actors
American male stage actors
American male television actors
American male voice actors
American people of Russian descent
Audiobook narrators
Male actors from New York City
People from Manhattan
Yale University alumni
20th-century American male actors
21st-century American male actors
American people of Eastern European descent